Schlanders is a comune (municipality) in South Tyrol in northern Italy, located about  west of the city of Bolzano.

Overview

Schlanders borders the following municipalities: Latsch, Laas, Mals, Martell, Schnals.

Another attraction is the renovated castle, which now serves as a civic hall (including a public library).

The locality was mentioned for the first time officially on 13 June 1077 in a deed of donation, where the Holy Roman Emperor Henry IV. handed over the town to Altwin, the Bishop of Brixen.

Society

Linguistic distribution
According to the 2011 census, 94.66% of the population speak German, 5.19% Italian and 0.14% Ladin as first language.

Notable people 
 Marian Tumler (1887–1987) an Austrian theologian and 62nd Grand Master of the Teutonic Order from 1948–1970
Sport
 René Gusperti (born 1971) former swimmer, competed at the 1992 & 1996 Summer Olympics 
 Nicole Gius (born 1980) alpine skier, competed at the 2002 & 2010 Winter Olympics
 Thomas Moriggl (born 1981) cross-country skier, competed at the 2010 Winter Olympics
 Stefan Thanei (born 1981) freestyle skier, competed in the 2018 Winter Olympics
 Barbara Moriggl (born 1982) cross-country skier and soldier
 Thomas Tragust (born 1986) ice-hockey goaltender
 Kevin Strobl (born 1997) badminton player

Twin towns
 Trecenta, Italy

References

External links

 Official website 

Municipalities of South Tyrol